Marecek, Pass Me the Pen! is a 1976 Czechoslovak comedy film directed by Oldřich Lipský. The film gained de facto cult status, many of its phrases and sentences becoming idiomatic in Czech language, e.g. “–Jak to chodí? –Chodí to výborně, ale neseje to” (“–How does it work? –It works great, but it doesn't sow.”) about a sowing machine.

Plot 
Jiří Kroupa (Jiří Sovák) is a man in his forties who is a team leader in a factory manufacturing agricultural machinery. He has an opportunity for promotion, but for that he needs to obtain a highschool graduation diploma. Kroupa resists vehemently, but is finally persuaded to enroll in the evening classes at a highschool where he is joined by a motley group of men and women of the same age group. Having found themselves in school again, the middle-aged Kroupa and his fellow students soon start acting like teenagers and with this and the teachers who find themselves instructing people their senior in the evenings and their children during the day, situation quickly gets out of hand.

Geographical mentions:
The movie often refers to a region Bohemian-Moravian highland. Plha is from Kojčice - a small village near Pelhřimov (district town). Another famous fictitious person - which is mentioned many times - but never appears in the film is Hliník (alluminium - Al). He never starts school as he moved to Humpolec - a bigger town in the same region as the above-mentioned. Quite a number of comical situations are based on Hliník name's similarity to the metal aluminium. 
The phrase "Hliník moved to Humpolec" became very popular and led to the creation of Hliník's museum and memorial plaque to the most famous citizen of Humpolec. People often bring aluminium subjects to his memorial plaque.

Cast 
 Jiří Sovák - Jiří Kroupa
 Iva Janžurová - Týfová
 Václav Lohniský - Hujer
 Míla Myslíková - Kroupová
 Josef Kemr - Plha
 Ladislav Smoljak - Tuček
 Zdeněk Svěrák - Šlajs
 František Kovařík - Prof. Hrbolek
 Josef Abrhám - Teacher Čeněk Janda
 Jiří Schmitzer - Jiří Kroupa jr.

External links 
 

1976 comedy films
1976 films
Czechoslovak comedy films
Films directed by Oldřich Lipský
Czech comedy films
Films with screenplays by Zdeněk Svěrák
1970s Czech films